Tushielaw Tower is a 16th-century tower house, about  north and east of Ettrick, Scottish Borders, Scotland, and west of Ettrick Water.

History
Adam Scott, known as the king of the Borders, or the king of thieves, built the tower in 1507, having received a feu charter from James IV of Scotland.  He was beheaded by order of James V of Scotland in 1530, for "theftuously taking Black-maill".  
A version of the ballad The Dowie Dens of Yarrow may originate in the murder of Walter Scott, son of Robert Scott of Thirlestane by John Scott of Tushielaw.

Structure
Only a basement, fragments of a courtyard, and a ruined outbuilding remain.  The basement, which is lit by roughly formed slits in its four walls, has its entry to the west. In the north gable there is an ambry.

See also
Castles in Great Britain and Ireland
List of castles in Scotland

References

Castles in the Scottish Borders